Kuraki or Koorki or Kowraki in Iran may refer to:
 Kuraki, Farashband
 Kuraki, Khonj
 Kowraki, Shiraz
 Korki (disambiguation)